Jason Ellsworth is an American politician serving as a Republican member of the Montana Senate. First elected in 2019, Ellsworth serves as the President pro Tempore of the Montana Senate.

Official Travel
In January 2021, Ellsworth was stopped for speeding on the interstate near Helena and told the trooper that he was late to a meeting with Governor Greg Gianforte. The trooper let him go without issuing a ticket.

In May 2021, Ellsworth was stopped again by a highway patrol trooper en route to Helena on suspicion of speeding, having been clocked doing 88 mph. In the encounter, Ellsworth threatened to contact the state's attorney general on the officer and claimed he couldn't be arrested because he was a lawmaker on his way to legislative work. Ellsworth was subsequently charged for speeding through a construction zone or an alternative charge of reckless driving and obstructing a peace officer.

References

External links 
Official Facebook

|-

1973 births
21st-century American politicians
Living people
People from Hamilton, Montana
People from Laconia, New Hampshire
Republican Party members of the Montana House of Representatives
Republican Party Montana state senators